The 2019 Australian Open wildcard playoffs and entries are a group of events and internal selections to choose the eight men and eight women singles wildcard entries for the 2019 Australian Open, as well as seven male and seven female doubles teams plus eight mixed-doubles teams.

Wildcard entries

Men's singles

Women's singles

Men's doubles

Women's doubles

Mixed doubles

American Wildcard Challenge 
The USTA awarded a wildcard to the man and woman that earned the most ranking points across a group of three ATP/Challenger hardcourt events in the October and November 2018. For the men, the events included ATP Paris, $75K Canberra, $75K Charlottesville, $75K+H Shenzhen, €106K+H Bratislava, €85K+H Mouilleron-le-Captif, $150K+H Bangalore, $150K+H Houston, $75K Champaign and $50K+H Kobe events. For the women, the events included $80K Macon, $80K Tyler and $80K Las Vegas and $150K+H Houston. For men, only the best two results from the three weeks of events were taken into account. While for women only the best three results from the four weeks of events were taken into account. The winners of the wildcard challenge were Jack Sock and Whitney Osuigwe.

Men's standings

Women's standings

Australian Women's Wildcard Challenge
Tennis Australia awarded a singles wildcard and a doubles wildcard to the Australian women that earned the most ranking points across a group of two ITF hardcourt events in the October and November 2018. The events included the 2018 Bendigo Women's International and the 2018 Canberra Tennis International. The winner of the wildcards were Priscilla Hon, and Ellen Perez and Arina Rodionova.

Singles standings

Doubles standings

Asia-Pacific Wildcard Playoff 
The Asia-Pacific Australian Open Wildcard Play-off featured 16-players in the men's and women's singles draws and took place from 26 November to 2 December 2018 at Hengqin International Tennis Centre in Zhuhai, China.

Men's singles

Seeds

Draw

Women's singles

Seeds

Draw

Men's doubles

Seeds

Draw

Women's doubles

Seeds

Draw

Australian Wildcard Playoff
The December Showdown is held annually for two weeks in December. The Showdown includes age championships for 12/u, 14/u, 16/u and 18/u age categories. It also hosts the 2019 Australian Wildcard Playoff which will be held from 10 to 16 December 2018 at Melbourne Park, offering a main draw singles wildcard for men and women and a main draw women's doubles wildcard.

Men's singles

Seeds

Draw

Women's singles

Seeds

Draw

Women's doubles

Seeds

Draw

References

External links 
 Asia/Pacific Wildcard Playoff
 Australian Wildcard Playoff
 USTA Wildcard Challenge